Isak Hansen-Aarøen (born 22 August 2004) is a Norwegian professional footballer who plays for Manchester United's youth teams as a midfielder or forward.

Hansen-Aarøen played for Tromsø's first-team at the age of 15, in the second-tier of Norwegian football, before joining Manchester United's youth system in 2020. He is a Norwegian youth international and has represented the country at under-15, under-16, under-18 and under-19 levels.

Club career
Hansen-Aarøen began his career in Tromsø's youth system. At the age of ten, he participated in the Manchester United Soccer Schools World Skills Final held at Manchester United's training facilities. In 2019, Hansen-Aarøen won the under-15 Talent of the Year award in a contest organised by the Norwegian Football Federation, TV 2 and Equinor's Heroes of Tomorrow initiative.

He made his senior debut for Tromsø on 6 July 2020, replacing Kent-Are Antonsen for the last minutes of a 2–0 win at Kongsvinger in a Norwegian 1. divisjon match. He became the youngest player in the club's history at the age of 15 years and 323 days.

In August 2020, he joined Manchester United. He had previously had trials with Liverpool and Everton. On 29 September he made his EFL Trophy debut for United's U21 team against Rochdale. On 2 October, he made his Premier League 2 debut against Blackburn Rovers U23s. On 27 August 2021, he signed his first professional contract with Manchester United.

International career
Hansen-Aarøen has played internationally for Norway at under-15, under-16, under-18 and under-19 levels. On 20 February 2020, he scored a hat-trick against Slovakia under-16.

Career statistics

Honours
Manchester United U18
FA Youth Cup: 2021–22

References

External links
Isak Hansen-Aarøen profile at the Manchester United FC website

2004 births
Living people
Sportspeople from Tromsø
Norwegian footballers
Association football forwards
Association football midfielders
Tromsø IL players
Manchester United F.C. players
Norwegian First Division players
Norway youth international footballers
Norwegian expatriate footballers
Norwegian expatriate sportspeople in England
Expatriate footballers in England